The Norton Anthology of Modern and Contemporary Poetry is an anthology of two volumes edited by Jahan Ramazani, Richard Ellmann (1918–1987), and Robert O'Clair.

The anthology is large, with 1,100 pages in each of the two volumes. Volume I, about modern poetry, and Volume II, contemporary poetry. Essays on poetics are included in each volume.

Published by W.W. Norton & Co., the anthology has gone through three editions, the latest published in 2003.

The three editors are academics or former academics: Jahan Ramazani is at the University of Virginia; Richard Ellmann, late of Oxford University and Emory University; Robert O'Clair, late of Manhattanville College.

Volume I: Modern Poetry
These poets are represented in the volume (listed chronologically by birth date, as in the book):

 Walt Whitman
 Emily Dickinson
 Thomas Hardy
 Gerard Manley Hopkins
 A. E. Housman
 William Butler Yeats
 Rudyard Kipling
 Edgar Lee Masters
 Edwin Arlington Robinson
 Gertrude Stein
 Amy Lowell
 Robert Frost
 Carl Sandburg
 Edward Thomas

 Wallace Stevens
 Mina Loy
 William Carlos Williams
 Elinor Wylie
 D. H. Lawrence
 Ezra Pound
 Siegfried Sassoon
 Hilda Doolittle ("H.D.")
 Robinson Jeffers
 Edwin Muir
 Edith Sitwell
 Marianne Moore
 John Crowe Ransom
 T. S. Eliot

 Ivor Gurney
 Claude McKay
 Isaac Rosenberg
 Edna St. Vincent Millay
 Archibald MacLeish
 Hugh MacDiarmid
 Wilfred Owen
 Dorothy Parker
 Charles Reznikoff
 E. E. Cummings
 Jean Toomer
 Robert Graves
 David Jones
 Austin Clarke

 Louise Bogan
 Melvin Tolson
 Hart Crane
 Allen Tate
 Basil Bunting
 Yvor Winters
 Laura Riding
 Sterling Brown
 Langston Hughes
 Stevie Smith
 Lorine Niedecker
 Countee Cullen
 Louis Zukofsky
 Richard Eberhart

 C. Day-Lewis
 Patrick Kavanagh
 Robert Penn Warren
 Stanley Kunitz
 Kenneth Rexroth
 John Betjeman
 William Empson
 W. H. Auden
 A. D. Hope
 Louis MacNeice
 George Oppen
 Theodore Roethke
 Stephen Spender
 Keith Douglas

Prose on poetics

 Walt Whitman
 Emily Dickinson
 Gerard Manley Hopkins
 William Butler Yeats

 T. E. Hulme
 Blast
 Mina Loy
 Amy Lowell, editor

 Wilfred Owen
 Ezra Pound
 T. S. Eliot
 William Carlos Williams

 D. H. Lawrence
 Langston Hughes
 Hart Crane
 Wallace Stevens

 Robert Frost
 Gertrude Stein
 Marianne Moore
 W. H. Auden

Volume II: Contemporary Poetry
These poets have work in the volume (listed chronologically by birth date, as in the book):

 Charles Olson
 Elizabeth Bishop
 May Swenson
 Robert Hayden
 Karl Shapiro
 Delmore Schwartz
 Muriel Rukeyser
 William Stafford
 Randall Jarrell
 John Berryman
 Dylan Thomas
 Judith Wright
 P. K. Page
 Robert Lowell
 Gwendolyn Brooks
 Robert Duncan
 William Meredith
 Lawrence Ferlinghetti
 Louise Bennett
 Howard Nemerov
 Amy Clampitt
 Richard Wilbur
 Kingsley Amis
 Donald Davie
 Philip Larkin

 Anthony Hecht
 James Dickey
 Alan Dugan
 Louis Simpson
 Denise Levertov
 Richard Hugo
 Kenneth Koch
 Maxine Kumin
 Donald Justice
 W. D. Snodgrass
 A. R. Ammons
 James Merrill
 Robert Creeley
 Allen Ginsberg
 Frank O'Hara
 Robert Bly
 Charles Tomlinson
 Galway Kinnell
 John Ashbery
 W. S. Merwin
 James Wright
 Philip Levine
 Thomas Kinsella
 Anne Sexton
 A. K. Ramanujan

 Richard Howard
 Adrienne Rich
 Thom Gunn
 John Hollander
 Derek Walcott
 Gary Snyder
 Kamau Brathwaite
 Christopher Okigbo
 Ted Hughes
 Okot p'Bitek
 Geoffrey Hill
 Sylvia Plath
 Mark Strand
 Wole Soyinka
 Amiri Baraka
 Charles Wright
 Mary Oliver
 Marge Piercy
 Lucille Clifton
 June Jordan
 Tony Harrison
 Susan Howe
 Michael S. Harper
 Charles Simic

 Les Murray
 Seamus Heaney
 Frank Bidart
 Michael Longley
 Margaret Atwood
 Eunice De Souza
 Robert Pinsky
 Robert Hass
 Lyn Hejinian
 Derek Mahon
 Sharon Olds
 Marilyn Hacker
 Dave Smith
 Louise Gluck
 Michael Palmer
 Michael Ondaatje
 James Tate
 Eavan Boland
 Craig Raine
 Norman Dubie
 Yusef Komunyakaa
 Lorna Goodison
 Ai
 Leslie Marmon Silko

 Agha Shahid Ali
 James Fenton
 Grace Nichols
 Charles Bernstein
 Carolyn Forche
 Jorie Graham
 Anne Carson
 Medbh McGuckian
 Joy Harjo
 Paul Muldoon
 Gary Soto
 Rita Dove
 Alberto Rios
 Mark Doty
 Thylias Moss
 Louise Erdrich
 Lorna Dee Cervantes
 Marilyn Chin
 Cathy Song
 Carol Ann Duffy
 Dionisio D. Martinez
 Henri Cole
 Li-Young Lee
 Sherman Alexie

Prose on poetics

 Charles Olson
 Dylan Thomas
 Philip Larkin
 Frank O'Hara

 Allen Ginsberg
 Amiri Baraka
 Denise Levertov

 Adrienne Rich
 Seamus Heaney
 Louise Bennett

 Charles Bernstein
 A. K. Ramanujan
 Derek Walcott

Additional information
ISBN numbers, 2003 edition
Two-volume instructor's set • 
Two-volume student set • 
Volume 1: Modern Poetry • 
Volume 2: Contemporary Poetry •

See also
Modern and contemporary poetry anthologies
 Oxford Book of Modern Verse 1892–1935
 New Poets of England and America
 The Harvill Book of Twentieth-Century Poetry in English
 Penguin Book of Contemporary Verse (1962)

United Kingdom
 The Oxford Book of Twentieth Century English Verse (1973)
 New British Poetry (2004)
 The Penguin Book of Contemporary British Poetry (1982)

United States
 The New American Poetry 1945–1960
 Postmodern American Poetry
 The Best American Poetry series

References

External links
 Information about the volumes at the W.W. Norton & Company Web site

2003 poetry books
Poetry anthologies